Lake Five, lake in Michigan
 Lake Five, lake in Montana
 Lake Five, community and lake in Wisconsin